Lucie LaRoche (born 23 October 1968) is a Canadian former alpine skier. She competed in the 1988 Winter Olympics and in the 1992 Winter Olympics. Lucie joined the Canadian National Ski Team in 1968, and was named Ski Quebec Alpin's athlete of the year in 1986. 

Lucie is the youngest of seven children of the architect Guy Laroche and his wife Suzanne. She grew up in a house at the foot of Mont St-Castin in the immediate vicinity of the ski resort of the same name in Lac-Beauport. Her older brothers, Yves, Dominique, Alain, and Phillip were also active as freestyle skiers.

References

1968 births
Living people
Canadian female alpine skiers
Olympic alpine skiers of Canada
Alpine skiers at the 1988 Winter Olympics